The 2011–12 Morelia season was the 65th professional season of Mexico's top-flight football league. The season is split into two tournaments—the Torneo Apertura and the Torneo Clausura—each with identical formats and each contested by the same eighteen teams. Morelia began their season on July 24, 2011 against Tijuana, Morelia played their homes games on Fridays at 8:10pm local time.

Torneo Apertura

Squad

Regular season

Apertura 2011 results

Final phase

Morelia advanced 4–2 on aggregate

4–4 on aggregate, Santos Laguna advanced due to being the higher seed in the classification phase

Goalscorers

Results

Results summary

Results by round

Transfers

In

Out

Torneo Clausura

Squad

Regular season

Clausura 2012 results

Final phase

UANL advanced 5–1 on aggregate

Goalscorers

Regular season

Source:

Final phase

Results

Results summary

Results by round

CONCACAF Champions League

Preliminary Round 

Notes
Note 1: Tempête of Haiti will play both of its Preliminary Round matches in the CONCACAF Champions League against Morelia in Mexico due to incomplete renovations to Stade Sylvio Cator in Port-au-Prince.
Monarcas Morelia won 7–0 on aggregate.

Group Standings 

Tiebreakers
Los Angeles Galaxy and Morelia qualified by their head-to-head records: Los Angeles Galaxy (6 pts, +1 GD), Morelia (6 pts, 0 GD), Alajuelense (6 pts, −1 GD).

Champions League results

Quarter-finals 

Monterrey won 7–2 on aggregate.

Goalscorers

Notes

References

2011–12 Primera División de México season
Mexican football clubs 2011–12 season